Taqwa (  / )
is an Islamic term for being conscious and cognizant of God, of truth, "piety, fear of God." It is often found in the Quran. Those who practice taqwa — in the words of Ibn Abbas, "believers who avoid Shirk with Allah and who work in His obedience" — are called muttaqin.

Definitions
The word “Taqwã” is derived from the verb waqã, which literally means to preserve, protect, safeguard, shield, etc. The Arabic word taqwa means "forbearance, fear and abstinence."

Some descriptions of the term from Islamic sources include:
"God consciousness ... piousness, fear of Allah, love for Allah, and self restraint".
"God-consciousness or God-fearing piety", "virtue", "wariness".
Fear of Allah, "being careful, knowing your place in the cosmos". "Proof" of Taqwa is the "experience of awe" of God, which "inspires a person to be on guard against wrong action" and eager to do the things which please Allah.
literally "to protect". In general, to protect yourself "from the Wrath of Allah" by not "indulging in things that Allah forbids".
"a high state of heart, which keeps one conscious of Allah's presence and His Knowledge." Taqwa motivates the person who possesses it "to perform righteous deeds" and avoid forbidden activities.
According to Erik Ohlander, in Quranic Arabic, taqwa refers to fear of God in terms of protecting oneself from displeasing God.

Theological interpretation
According to Tafsir ibn Kathir, the root meaning of taqwa is to avoid what one dislikes.  It was reported that Umar bin Khattab asked Ubayy ibn Ka'b about Taqwa.  Ubay said, "Have you ever walked on a path that has thorns on it?"  Umar said, "Yes."  Ubayy asked, "What did you do then?" to which Umar replied, "I rolled up my sleeves and struggled."  Ubayy said, "That is taqwa, to protect oneself from sin through life's dangerous journey so that one can successfully complete the journey unscathed by sin."

Taqwa and the Qur'an
According to Erik Ohlander, the word taqwa is used in the Qur'an over 100 times. According to the Oxford Dictionary of Islam, the word taqwa and its derivatives appear "more than 250 times" in the Qur'an.

The Quran mentions a number of virtues that cultivate taqwa or that taqwa cultivates in a person: Q.2:283 mentions the keeping of trusts (amana); Q.3:76 faithfulness (al-wafa); Q.3:186 patience (al-sabr). Q.7:96, Q.10:63-64, Q.39:10 relate taqwa to the good life (hasanat) on this earth besides reward in the hereafter. Q.65:3 relates taqwa to material ease in this life even where the believer does not expect it.

The imperative form of taqwa is found in the phrase Ittaqullah ("fear God" or "be aware of Allah"), which is in a number of verses.

Taqwa and fiqh
In at least one popular work of fiqh (Islamic jurisprudence), the "Book of Taqwa", (i.e. the section on taqwa) deals with "knowledge of what is Haraam (forbidden), Makruh (discouraged) and doubtful" in an assortment of matters beyond "the pillars of Islam". These include: foods, dress, things having to do with sex ("private matters"), kinds of sporting contests, music, gossip, bad mouthing, bad company, beard trimming, etc.

Sufism
Taqwa is an important concept in Sufism.

The 10th-century Sufi scholar Al-Qushayri, in his Epistle (Al-Risala al-Qushayriyya), writes about  three parts of taqwa: "full trust in God with respect to what has not been granted to him; full satisfaction with what has been granted to him; and full patience with respect to what has eluded him."

In Sufism, taqwa has several degrees. The first degree or rank is that of the common people. This rank shuns anything associated with God. In other words, the common people participate in taqwa by simply avoiding shirk. The second degree or rank of taqwa are the elect who shun sins. The final rank is that of the prophets who avoid attributing acts to anyone other than God — "in other words, their fear comes to them from Him and is [directed] to Him." The highest rank are those who distance themselves from everything that separates them from God, for one of the main goals in Sufism is to get closer to God, because in Sufi thought the state of being separate from God is a privation equivalent to the torments of hell.

The master-disciple relationship is one of great importance within Sufi practice. Taqwa is greatly valued within this relationship. God-fearing piety is seen as great religious devotion because it allows for "unhesitating obedience for the order's superior." In other words, if one can blindly follow his master, then he should be able to blindly follow God. Taqwa then leads to a lack of questioning authority, for the disciple submits to those with greater power than him. This submission reminds the disciple of God's power making the disciple a more devout worshipper of God.

References

External links
 Canonical definition of those who have Taqwa in The Qur'an Sura 2 Signs 2-5

Islamic theology
Quranic words and phrases